Sarah Vinci (born 4 December 1991) is a 1 point wheelchair basketball player who plays for the Perth Western Stars in the Australian Women's National Wheelchair Basketball League. She made her debut with the Australia women's national wheelchair basketball team, known as the Gliders, in 2011, when she played in the Osaka Cup in Japan. Vinci represented Australia at the 2012 Summer Paralympics in London in wheelchair basketball, winning a silver medal. She represented Australia at the 2020 Summer Paralympics in Tokyo.

Personal life
Vinci was born on 4 December 1991 in Perth, Western Australia.  She has spina bifida. , Vinci lives in Perth, Western Australia,  and is a student.  She has already attended a Technical and Further Education (TAFE) institute, where she earned a certificate in digital media.

Sarah volunteers at the Telethon community cinemas to help support children's charities.

Career

Vinci is a 1 point wheelchair basketball player. She started playing wheelchair basketball in 2006. Vinci joined the Perth Western Stars in the Women's National Wheelchair Basketball League (WNWBL) in 2009, and has been with the club into the 2013 season. In 2010, she won the league's junior championship, the Kevin Coombs Cup,  when her team beat the New South Wales side 63–58.

Vinci was selected to participate in a national team training camp in 2010, and made her debut with the national team, universally known as the Gliders, the following year, when she played in the Osaka Cup in Japan. She competed in the 2011 Asia Oceania Regional Championships, the 2011 U25 World Championships, and the 2012 BT Paralympic World Cup, competing in the final match against Germany.

Vinci was selected to represent Australia at the 2012 Summer Paralympics in wheelchair basketball. The London Games were her first. She attended a Paralympic farewell ceremony at Perth's State Basketball Centre in late July.

In the group stage, the Australia women's national wheelchair basketball team at the 2012 Summer Paralympics posted wins against Brazil, Great Britain,  and the Netherlands,  but lost to Canada. This was enough to advance the Gliders to the quarter-finals, where they beat Mexico. The Gliders then defeated the United States by a point to set up a final clash with Germany. The Gliders lost 44–58, and earned a silver medal.

At the 2013 Osaka Cup in Japan, Vinci and the Gliders successfully defended the title they had previously won in 2008, 2009, 2010 and 2012.

She represented Australia at the 2018 Wheelchair Basketball World Championship where the team came ninth.

At the 2020 Tokyo Paralympics, the Gliders finished ninth after winning the 9th-10th classification match.

Statistics

Gallery

References

External links

 
 Basketball Australia profile

Wheelchair category Paralympic competitors
Wheelchair basketball players at the 2012 Summer Paralympics
Wheelchair basketball players at the 2020 Summer Paralympics
Paralympic silver medalists for Australia
Paralympic wheelchair basketball players of Australia
1991 births
Living people
People with paraplegia
People with spina bifida
Medalists at the 2012 Summer Paralympics
Australian women's wheelchair basketball players
Paralympic medalists in wheelchair basketball
Sportspeople from Perth, Western Australia
Sportswomen from Western Australia